Patricia Obregón (18 February 1952 – 6 October 2020) was a Costa Rican archer. She competed in the women's individual event at the 1992 Summer Olympics.

References

1952 births
2020 deaths
Costa Rican female archers
Olympic archers of Costa Rica
Archers at the 1992 Summer Olympics
Sportspeople from San José, Costa Rica
20th-century Costa Rican women